This is a list of airports in Guyana, sorted by location.

Guyana, officially the Co-operative Republic of Guyana and previously known as British Guiana, is a state on the northern coast of South America. Guyana is bordered to the east by Suriname, to the south and southwest by Brazil, to the west by Venezuela, and to the north by the Atlantic Ocean. It is the only state of the Commonwealth of Nations on mainland South America. Guyana is also a member of the Caribbean Community (CARICOM), which has its secretariat headquarters in Guyana's capital, Georgetown.



Airports 

Airport names shown in bold have scheduled passenger service on commercial airlines.

See also 
 Transport in Guyana
 List of airports by ICAO code: S#SY - Guyana
 Wikipedia: WikiProject Aviation/Airline destination lists: South America#Guyana

References 
 
  - includes IATA codes
 Airports in Guyana. World Aero Data. - ICAO codes, airport data
 Airports in Guyana. Great Circle Mapper. - IATA and ICAO codes

Guyana
 
Airports
Airports
Guyana